Highway 680 is a highway in the Canadian province of Saskatchewan.

See also 
Roads in Saskatchewan
Transportation in Saskatchewan

References

680